The 1930 Palestine Cup (HaGavia HaEretz-Israeli) was the third season of Israeli Football Association's nationwide football cup competition. The defending holders were Maccabi Tel Aviv.

For the second (and last) season, teams were allowed to enter their reserve teams, and such teams were entered on behalf of Hapoel Haifa, Hapoel Tel Aviv and Maccabi Tel Aviv. Maccabi's B team eventually won the cup, a feat achieve by fielding the stronger A team under the guise of the B team. This was allowed as the club chose to forfeit their A team's first round tie away against Hapoel Haifa B, while the B team won their tie easily, and thus keeping their A team from being cup-tied and allowing their A Team players to play for the B team for the remainder of the competition.

Maccabi Tel Aviv B (as registered) won the cup, beating the British team of the Northamptonshire Regiment 2–1 in the final, which was held on Hapoel Tel Aviv ground.

Results

First round
First round matches started on 15 February 1930. The rest of the matches were played the following Saturday. The replay between British Police and RAF Amman was delayed as the soldiers were in military duty, and was finally played on 8 March 1930.

Replay

Quarter-finals
The quarter-finals matches started on 1 March 1930.

Semi-finals

Final

Notes

References
100 Years of Football 1906-2006, Elisha Shohat (Israel), 2006

External links
 Israel Football Association website 

Israel State Cup
Cup
Israel State Cup seasons